Christopher Francis Palmer (9 September 194622 January 1995) was an English composer, arranger and orchestrator; biographer of composers, champion of lesser-known composers and writer on film music and other musical subjects; record producer; and lecturer.  He was involved in a very wide range of projects and his output was prodigious.  He came to be regarded as one of the finest symphonic orchestrators of his generation.  He was dedicated to the conservation, recording and promotion of classic film scores by composers such as Bernard Herrmann, Dimitri Tiomkin, Franz Waxman, Miklós Rózsa, Elmer Bernstein and others.   He wrote full biographies as well as sleeve notes, radio scripts, reviews and articles, on composers such as Benjamin Britten, Frederick Delius, Karol Szymanowski, Arthur Bliss, George Dyson, Herbert Howells, Maurice Ravel, Nikolai Tcherepnin and others.

He arranged music from the film scores and other music of William Walton, Malcolm Arnold, Ralph Vaughan Williams, Ernest Bloch.  Artists who have performed his work include José Carreras, James Galway, Julian Lloyd Webber, and Jill Gomez. Outside the area of music, he put together anthologies of the prose of Arthur Machen and James Farrar. He died of an AIDS-related disease at the age of 48.

Biography
Palmer was born in Norfolk in 1946. He early showed interest in music, encouraged by his father, a RAF pilot, who had trained as a church organist. He was educated at Norwich School and studied the organ at Saxlingham, then went on to the University of Cambridge, where he qualified in modern languages and music. His teachers at Cambridge included Peter le Huray and Sir David Willcocks.

His first involvement in film music was as a writer, and through this he met many film composers in the United Kingdom and the United States.  He struck up a friendship with Bernard Herrmann, who was living in London at the time.  He assisted Herrmann with his scoring for Taxi Driver and Obsession (both released in 1976; Herrmann died in December 1975, just after completing the score to Taxi Driver). Through Herrmann, Palmer had met Charles Gerhardt, with whom he collaborated on at least 15 albums. Miklós Rózsa was impressed by Palmer's critiques of his work and invited him to assist with the orchestration of his score for Providence (1977) and all his subsequent films.  He then met Elmer Bernstein, who used Palmer's assistance in scoring Heavy Metal (1981).  This led to further orchestration work with film composers such as Maurice Jarre (A Passage to India (1984), Mad Max Beyond Thunderdome (1985)), Stanley Myers (The Witches (1990)), and many others.

Not content to work only on new film projects, Christopher Palmer also sought to preserve the legacy of the past, by arranging symphonic suites from the scores of composers such as Sir Malcolm Arnold, William Alwyn, Sir Arthur Bliss, George Gershwin, Bronisław Kaper, Erich Wolfgang Korngold, Jerome Moross, Alfred Newman, Alex North, Conrad Salinger, Max Steiner, Dimitri Tiomkin, Sir William Walton, Franz Waxman, and Roy Webb. He appeared as himself in the 1992 documentary film Music for the Movies: Bernard Herrmann.

He collaborated with Sergei Prokofiev's son Oleg Prokofiev on the publication of Serge Prokofiev, Soviet Diary, 1927 and other writings (Faber and Faber, 1991). His planned biography of Prokofiev was left unfinished at his death, which was due to an HIV/AIDS-related illness in 1995, when he was aged only 48.

One of the last things he said to Ray Sumby, his literary editor, was "Ray, don't take on too much."

Arrangements and orchestrations
Christopher Palmer's arrangements and orchestrations included:
 For the memorial service for Lord Laurence Olivier in October 1989, Palmer created a version of Sir William Walton's march Crown Imperial for solo organ, brass, timpani and percussion (with harp ad lib).  He arranged Walton's score for Henry V (1944), under the title Henry V: A Shakespeare Scenario; a recording was released in 1990, with Christopher Plummer reading the speeches.  
 He arranged Sergei Prokofiev's music to the film Ivan the Terrible into a concert scenario (1990).
 He made a concert suite from the music to The Bridge on the River Kwai (1957) by Malcolm Arnold, including "The River Kwai March". He arranged an item from Arnold's score for the film You Know What Sailors Are (1954) as "Scherzetto for clarinet and orchestra".
 He arranged music from Ralph Vaughan Williams' The Pilgrim's Progress as A Bunyan Sequence.  A recording featured Sir John Gielgud as narrator.
 He arranged Ernest Bloch's From Jewish Life for cello, strings and harp (it was originally set for cello and piano).
 He arranged Malcolm Arnold's music for the 1954 film The Belles of St. Trinian's as a concert suite for piano four hands and orchestra.
 The Holy Boy by John Ireland (originally for piano, 1913), for solo cello and strings (1993) and for solo voice, choir and string orchestra (1993).

Record producer
His activities as a record producer included:
 the world premiere commercial recording in 1992 of Constant Lambert's choral masque Summer's Last Will and Testament
 a complete recording of Benjamin Britten's last opera, Death in Venice, made for a television film directed by Tony Palmer.

Writings
Christopher Palmer's writings included:
 Impressionism in Music (1973)
 Miklós Rózsa. A Sketch of His Life And Work. With a foreword by Eugene Ormandy (1975)
 Delius: Portrait of a Cosmopolitan. London: Duckworth (1976)
 Szymanowski (1983)
 The Britten Companion, ed. Palmer (1984)
 Tcherepnin, Nikolay, in The New Grove Dictionary of Opera, ed. Stanley Sadie (1992)
 writings on Arthur Bliss, George Dyson, Herbert Howells, Maurice Ravel, Dimitri Tiomkin
 he made an English translation of Darius Milhaud's autobiography Notes Without Music, with an additional chapter by himself
 The Composer in Hollywood (1990: Marion Boyars, publisher)
 his work on a new biography of Sergei Prokofiev was cut short by his death in 1995.  His papers on this project are stored at the Serge Prokofiev Archive

He was effectively the editor of Miklós Rózsa's memoir, Double Life (1982), which he organized from the composer's dictated recollections. In addition there were record reviews, program notes, radio scripts, lecture scripts, and record sleeve notes.  Christopher Palmer was twice nominated, both times unsuccessfully, for the Grammy Award for Best Album Notes:
 in 1975 for Herrmann: Citizen Kane performed by Charles Gerhardt conducting the National Philharmonic Orchestra
 in 1976 for Korngold: Die tote Stadt performed by Erich Leinsdorf conducting the Munich Radio Orchestra with solos by René Kollo, Carol Neblett, Hermann Prey and Benjamin Luxon.

Film music
Christopher Palmer composed the original music for Miloš Forman's film Valmont (1989).

He worked as an orchestrator or arranger on such films as Obsession (1976), Zulu Dawn (1979), A Passage to India (1984), Spies Like Us (1985), Legal Eagles (1986), Scenes from the Class Struggle in Beverly Hills (1989), Shirley Valentine (1989) and The Witches (1990).

He was the Musical Assistant/Associate on films such as The French Lieutenant's Woman (1981) and Mad Max Beyond Thunderdome (1985), Music Co-Producer on Greystoke: The Legend of Tarzan, Lord of the Apes (1984), and Music Consultant on Cape Fear (1991).

References

Sources
 In Memoriam Christopher Palmer (1946–1995): obituaries by David Wishart and Ian Lace; Music Web International
 Donald Mitchell, Obituary, The Independent, 27 January 1995

External links
 

1946 births
1995 deaths
English film score composers
English male film score composers
English record producers
English biographers
English writers about music
British film historians
AIDS-related deaths in England
Alumni of Trinity College, Cambridge
Musicians from Norwich
People educated at Norwich School
20th-century biographers
20th-century classical musicians
20th-century English composers
20th-century British male musicians
20th-century British musicians
Writers from Norwich
20th-century British businesspeople